Aberffraw is village and community in Anglesey, Wales.

Aberffraw may also refer to:

Aberffraw, an electoral ward in Gwynedd prior to 1996
Aberffraw cantref, a medieval area of administration of Anglesey
Bro Aberffraw, an electoral ward of Anglesey, created in 2012
House of Aberffraw, the succession of Rhodri the Great, King of Gwynedd